Ashberg Diamond is a diamond, which was once included in the Russian Crown Jewels.  It weighs .

This is believed to have been mined in South Africa, because of its characteristics.  In 1934 the Russian Trade Delegation sold the diamond to Mr. Ashberg, a leading Stockholm banker.

See also
List of diamonds

References

External links
Ashberg Diamond feature
https://web.archive.org/web/20110710122725/http://www.diamondinformer.com/Articles/Ashberg.html

Diamonds originating in South Africa
Individual diamonds